In vector calculus a solenoidal vector field (also known as an incompressible vector field, a divergence-free vector field, or a  transverse vector field) is a vector field v with divergence zero at all points in the field:

A common way of expressing this property is to say that the field has no sources or sinks.

Properties
The divergence theorem gives an equivalent integral definition of a solenoidal field; namely that for any closed surface, the net total flux through the surface must be zero:

where  is the outward normal to each surface element.

The fundamental theorem of vector calculus states that any vector field can be expressed as the sum of an irrotational and a solenoidal field. The condition of zero divergence is satisfied whenever a vector field v has only a vector potential component, because the definition of the vector potential A as:

automatically results in the identity (as can be shown, for example, using Cartesian coordinates):

The converse also holds: for any solenoidal v there exists a vector potential A such that  (Strictly speaking, this holds subject to certain technical conditions on v, see Helmholtz decomposition.)

Etymology
Solenoidal has its origin in the Greek word for solenoid, which is σωληνοειδές (sōlēnoeidēs) meaning pipe-shaped, from σωλην (sōlēn) or pipe. In the present context of solenoidal it means constrained as if in a pipe, so with a fixed volume.

Examples

 The magnetic field B (see Gauss's law for magnetism)
 The velocity field of an incompressible fluid flow
 The vorticity field
 The electric field E in neutral regions;
 The current density J where the charge density is unvarying, .
 The magnetic vector potential A in Coulomb gauge

See also
 Longitudinal and transverse vector fields
 Stream function
 Conservative vector field

Notes

References

Vector calculus
Fluid dynamics